Bangladeshi-Indian or Indian-Bangladeshi may refer to:
Bangladesh–India relations
Bangladeshis in India
Indians in Bangladesh

See also
Bengali people